Sokolica may refer to:

Sokolica, Lower Silesian Voivodeship (south-west Poland)
Sokolica, Warmian-Masurian Voivodeship (north Poland)
Sokolica (Pieniny), peak in Pieniny, mountain range in the south of Poland.
Sokolica Monastery, a Serbian Orthodox monastery in Kosovo
Sokolica (mountain), a Mountain in Kosovo